The 2019 Bauchi State House of Assembly election was held on March 9, 2019 to elect members of the Bauchi State House of Assembly in Nigeria. All 31 seats were up for election in the Bauchi State House of Assembly.

Abubakar Suleiman from APC representing Ningi Central constituency was elected Speaker, while Danlami Kawule from PDP representing Zungur/Galambi/Miri constituency was elected Deputy Speaker.

Results 
The result of the election is listed below.

 Danlami Kawule from PDP won Zungur/Galambi/Miri constituency
 Abubakar Suleiman from APC won Ningi Central constituency
 Jamilu Umaru Dahiru from NNPP won Bauchi Central constituency
 Babayo Muhammad from PDP won Hardawa constituency
 Bakoji Aliyu Bobbo from PDP won Chiroma constituency
 Tijjani Mohammed Aliyu from APC won Azare/Madangala constituency
 Mohammed Musa Lumo from PDP won Lere/Bula constituency
 Kawuwa Damina from APC won Darazo constituency
 Tukur Ibrahim from APC won Toro/Jama'a constituency
 Baballe Abubakar Dambam from APC won Dambam/Dagauda/Jalam constituency
 Wanzam Mohammed from PDP won Sakwa constituency
 Yusuf Mohammed Bako from APC won Pali constituency
 Abdullahi Bala Dan from PDP won Duguri/Gwana constituency
 Musa Wakili from PDP won Bogoro constituency
 Musa Mantai Baraza from APC won Dass constituency
 Bala Abdu Rishi from APC won Lame constituency
 Yunusa Ahmed from APC won Warji constituency
 Ado Wakili from APC won Burra constituency
 Sade Sabo Bako from PDP won Sade constituency
 Gazali Abubakar from APC won Ganjuwa East constituency
 Yusuf Inuwa Dadiye from APC won Ganjuwa West constituency
 Mukhtar A. Sulaiman from APC won Katagum constituency
 Sale Mohammed from APC won Jama'are constituency
 Bala Rabilu from APC won Itas/Gadau constituency
 Hodi Jibir Bello from APC won Disina constituency
 Mu'azu Shira from APC won Shira constituency
 Dan Umma Bello from APC won Giade constituency
 Umar Yakubu from APC won Udubo constituency
 Bello Sarkin Jadori from APC won Gamawa constituency
 Abdulkadir Umar Dewu from APC won Kirfi constituency
 Ali Dan'Iya from APC won Madara/Chinade constituency

References 

Bauchi
Bauchi State elections